The Swedish Board of Student Finance (CSN), is a Swedish government agency under the Ministry of Education and Research. It is in charge of administration of all matters regarding student aid in Sweden. Its seat is located in Sundsvall and its Director-General is Christina Forsberg.

See also 
Education in Sweden
List of universities in Sweden
Swedish National Agency for Higher Education
Swedish National Agency for Services to Universities
Swedish National board of Appeal for Higher Education

External links 
Official site

Board of Student Aid
Education in Sweden